The Zamindars of Monraj, also known as the Monraj Saheb family, were the erstwhile aristocrats of Monraj village, Kulaura, Moulvibazar District, Bangladesh. The Zamindars of Monraj are a branch of the Prithimpassa family who were the erstwhile Nawabs of Longla. The family are Shi'ites. Some of the family have migrated to Dhaka.

Origin 

The Monraj Saheb family was founded by Nawabzada Ali Zafar Khan who was the second son of Nawab Qazi Muhammad Ali Khan of Prithimpassa and the younger brother of Nawab Gaus Ali Khan. The family's earliest recorded ancestor, Sakhi Salamat, was a Persian nobleman from Greater Khorasan.  who had arrived in the Indian subcontinent at the end of the 15th century. After initially residing at the court of the Lodi sultans of Delhi, he later moved to Sylhet, where he was granted land in the Prithimpassa mouza (located in the pargana of Longla).

History 
The Zamindars of Monraj held a lot of land in Kulaura, Shillong, Manipur, Assam, Tripura and other parts of India. One of the most notable assets owned was the Coal mine in Nagaland. The family held all these properties until the East Bengal State Acquisition and Tenancy Act of 1950.

Nawabzada Ali Zafar Khan was the first Zamindar of Monraj and the Son of Prithimpassa's Nawab Muhammad Ali Khan. Ali Zafar married into the Ghagtia Chowdhury  Bari of Kulaura, and had two sons the youngest being Ali Gohor Khan.

Zamindar Ali Gohor Khan was the 2nd Zaminder of Monraj and the Second son of Nawabzada Ali Zafar Khan. Ali Gohor was a strong supporter of the Muslim Party. He had his education from Aligarh University. Ali Gohor married into the Koula Chowdhury Bari of Kulaura and had two sons named Ali Akthar Khan and Ali Afsar Khan. Due to his marriage into Koula he became related to the Kanihati Chaudhury family

Zamindar Ali Ashjad Khan was the 3rd Zaminder of Monraj and the eldest grandson of Nawabzada Ali Zafar through his first child. Ali Ashjad had 4 daughters but no sons. One daughter married Abdul Jabbar Chowdhury of the Bizli Chowdhury family. Another married Syed Shamsuddin Hussain of Tarpi Saheb Bari. Another married Zamindar  Syed Ali Akthar of Pallakandi Saheb Bari and another married Zamindar Ali Ather Khan of Prithimpassa Chhoto Saheb Bari.

Zamindar Ali Akthar Khan born in 1893 was the last Zaminder of Monraj. He was the final Zamindar up until the East Bengal State Acquisition and Tenancy Act of 1950. During his tenure he purchased a lot of land and started a partnership business in Kailashahar and Shillong. He studied at the Presidency University, Kolkata. Ali Akthar married Syeda Nadira Banu from Narapati West Haveli, Habiganj. Through this marriage he became the brother-in-law of Syed Gaziul Haque the grandson of Nawab Faizunnesa. His wife Nadira Banu was the direct descendant of Syed Nasiruddin, hence the Monraj Shaheb Family became related to the Syeds of Taraf. Ali Akthar had two sons, Anwar and Zafar. Ali Akthar died in 1970.

Ali Anwar Khan was the Saheb of Monraj. He studied at Shillong. Ali Anwar married Pirzadi Syeda Sanwara Akther from Nasirpur Saheb Bari Brahmanbaria. Syeda Sanwara Akther was also a direct descendant of Syed Nasiruddin. Anwar had 2 sons and 2 daughters. Ali Anwar died in 2016.

Ali Zafar Khan (Kona Shaheb) was the second son of Ali Akthar. He was the Headmaster of Champa Ray Tea Estate in Kamalganj. He married Jamila Khatun Chowdhury of Durmut Chowdhury Bari and has two sons. He is currently living in Chunarughat. 

Ali Haider Khan is second son of Ali Anwar Khan and the current Joint Head of the Monraj Shaheb Family. He resides in London.

Zaminder's 

The 6 Monraj Zamindar's are:

References 

Prithimpassa family
Families from Isfahan
Muslim families
Bengali families
Zamindari estates
Bangladeshi families
People from Kulaura Upazila